Husslin' is an EP by Canadian rapper Kardinal Offishall, released independently on April 11, 2000, on Figure IV Entertainment, and distributed by Fat Beats Records in the United States. The title track, "Husslin'", was one of the hottest 12" singles of 2000. "And What?", featuring Saukrates, was released as a single in 1999. "Husslin'" and "Mic T.H.U.G.S." also appear on Kardinal's second studio album, Quest for Fire: Firestarter, Vol. 1. An updated version of "U R Ghetto When", known as "U R Ghetto 2002", is on the Quest for Fire album.

Reception

AllMusic stated "Husslin' offers just a peek of the best that Canadian hip-hop has to offer," also praising Kardinal as "Canada's best hip-hop producer." The EP was nominated for Best Rap Recording at the 2001 Juno Awards.

Track listing

Samples
"Mic T.H.U.G.S." contains a sample of "Eazy-Duz-It" by Eazy-E
"U R Ghetto When" contains a sample of "Elegant Evening" by The Crusaders

References

2000 debut EPs
Kardinal Offishall albums
Albums produced by Kardinal Offishall
Albums produced by Saukrates
Fat Beats Records EPs
Hip hop EPs